Sebastian Kulathunkal  is an Indian politician serving as the MLA of Poonjar Constituency since May 2021. His party is Kerala Congress (M). In the 2021 election, he won against the preceding MLA P.C. George by a total of 16000 votes.

References 

Kerala MLAs 2021–2026
Living people
1966 births